Peng Chau Public Pier is a public pier in Peng Chau, New Territories, Hong Kong. It is located in Wing On Side Street and next to Peng Chau Ferry Pier. The old pier was built in 1955 and replaced by the new one in 2004. The pier is mainly for loading and unloading of goods, and running kai-to operation between Peng Chau and Nim Shue Wan in Discovery Bay via Trappist Haven Monastery on Lantau Island.

References

Transport infrastructure completed in 1955
Transport infrastructure completed in 2004
Piers in Hong Kong
Peng Chau
1955 establishments in Hong Kong